The Public Utility Commission of Texas (PUC or PUCT) is a state agency that regulates the state’s electric, water and telecommunication utilities, implements respective legislation, and offers customer assistance in resolving consumer complaints.

In 1975, the Texas Legislature enacted the Public Utility Regulatory Act (PURA) and created the Public Utility Commission of Texas (PUC) to provide statewide regulation of the rates and services of electric and telecommunications utilities. Roughly twenty years later, the combined effects of significant Texas legislation in 1995 and the Federal Telecommunications Act of 1996 resulted in competition in telecommunication’s wholesale and retail services and the creation of a competitive electric wholesale market. Further changes in the 1999 Texas Legislature not only called for a restructuring of the electric utility industry but also created new legislation that ensured the protection of customers’ rights in the new competitive environment. Over the years, these various changes have dramatically re-shaped the PUC’s mission and focus, shifting from up-front regulation of rates and services to oversight of competitive markets and compliance enforcement of statutes and rules. In 2013, the Texas Legislature added water utility regulation to the agency's responsibilities.

Since the introduction of competition in both the local and long distance telecommunications markets and the wholesale and retail electric markets, the PUC has also played an important role in overseeing the transition to competition and ensuring that customers receive the intended benefits of competition.

Appointed by the Texas Governor, the five-member commission also regulates the rates and services of transmission and distribution utilities that operate where there is competition, investor-owned electric utilities where competition has not been chosen, and incumbent local exchange companies that have not elected incentive regulation.

The PUC’s mission is to “protect customers, foster competition, and promote high quality infrastructure.”

The agency is headquartered in the William B. Travis State Office Building at 1701 North Congress in Austin. In 2011, the former commission chairman, Barry Smitherman resigned to become a member of the Texas Railroad Commission, under appointment from Governor Rick Perry.

List of former and current members
 Garrett Morris - Chairman, 1975-1978; Commissioner, 1978-1982
 George Cowden - Commissioner, 1975-1978; Chairman, 1978 - 1983
 Alan Erwin - Commissioner, 1975 - 1979; Chairman, 1983 - 1984
 Moak Rollins - Commissioner, 1979 - January 1982; Chairman, Feb 1982 - March 1983
 Tommie Smith - Commissioner, 1982 - 1983
 Philip Ricketts - Commissioner, 1983 - 1984; Chairman, 1984 - 1985
 Peggy Rosson - Commissioner, 1983 - 1985; Chairman, 1985 -1987
 Dennis Thomas - Commissioner, 1984 - 1987; Chairman, 1987 - 1988
 William Cassin - Commissioner, 1988 - 1989
 Jo Campbell - Commissioner, 1985 - 1991
 Paul Meek - Chairman, 1989 - 1992
 Marta Greytok - Commissioner, 1987 - 1992; Chairman, 1993
 Karl R. Rábago - Commissioner, 1992 - 1995
 Sarah Goodfriend - Commissioner, 1993 - 1995
 Robert Gee - Commissioner, 1991 - 1993, 1995 - 1997; Chairman, 1994 
 Pat Curran - Commissioner, 1997 - 1998
 Judy Walsh - Commissioner, July 1995 - 2001
 Pat Wood, III - Chairman, February 1995 - August 2001
 Max Yzaguirre - Chairman, June 2001 - 2002
 Brett A. Perlman - Commissioner, January 1999 - 2003
 Rebecca Klein - Commissioner, June 2001 - May 2002; Chairman, May 2002 - 2004
 Paul Hudson - Commissioner, 2003; Chairman, 2004 - 2008 
 Julie Caruthers Parsley - Commissioner, November 2002 - 2008
 Barry T. Smitherman - Commissioner, April 2004 - November 2007; Chairman November 2007 - 2011
 Rolando Pablos - Commissioner, September 2001 - 2013
 Donna L. Nelson - Commissioner, August 2008 - July 2011; Chairman July 2011 - August 2017
 Kenneth W. Anderson Jr. - Commissioner, September 2008 - August 2017
 Brandy Marty Marquez - Commissioner, August 2013 - 2018
 Arthur C. D'Andrea - Commissioner, November 2017 - March 2021
 DeAnn T. Walker - Chairman, September 2017 - March 2021
 Shelly Botkin - Commissioner, June 2018 - March 2021
 Will McAdams - Commissioner, April 2021 – present
 Peter Lake - Chairman, April 2021 – present
 Lori Cobos - Commissioner, June 2021 – present
 Jimmy Glotfelty - Commissioner, August 2021 – present
 Kathleen Jackson - Commissioner, August 2022 – present

See also
 Electric Reliability Council of Texas
 Railroad Commission of Texas

References

External links
 Official site

Public Utilities Commission
Texas
1975 establishments in Texas